The 1898 Toronto Argonauts season was the club's first season as a member club of the Ontario Rugby Football Union. The team finished in fourth place in the Senior Championship of the ORFU with six losses, and failed to qualify for the Dominion playoffs.

Regular season

Standings

Schedule

References

Toronto Argonauts seasons